"Reward" is a song by English band the Teardrop Explodes. It was released as a single in early 1981 and is the band's biggest hit, peaking at No. 6 in the UK and No. 11 in Ireland. The song was not initially included in the original 1980 UK & Europe releases of their debut album Kilimanjaro, but was included in the 1980 U.S. release together with the track "Suffocate" (replacing two tracks from the UK release). "Reward" was however added to later pressings of the album from 1981.

The song's creation started with Alan Gill who suggested a bassline for Julian Cope and melody for David Balfe.  Julian Cope's opening lyric, "Bless my cotton socks, I'm in the news" reflected his exhilaration at their burgeoning success while the use of trumpet was influenced by Love's Forever Changes.  Cope composed and controlled the mixing so the production and recording was done more than once to achieve the frantic pace he wanted.

References

1980 songs
1981 singles
The Teardrop Explodes songs
Songs written by Julian Cope
Song recordings produced by Clive Langer
Song recordings produced by Alan Winstanley
Mercury Records singles